Late for Nothing is the third studio album by the American metalcore band Iwrestledabearonce, released through Century Media on August 6, 2013. It is the band's first release with vocalist Courtney LaPlante.

Track listing

Additional Info 
On August 6, 2013, the band released the music video for "Boat Paddle" via their Facebook page to coincide with the release of the album.
As of August 7, 2013, a full album stream (via SoundCloud) is still available on Loudwire in an article to promote the album. It includes every track of the album, with the exception of "The Map". The article was written by the website's Senior Writer Graham 'Gruhamed' Hartmann, and was published on July 30, 2013.

Personnel 
Iwrestledabearonce
 Steven Bradley – guitar, programming, engineering, mastering, mixing
 John Ganey – guitar, programming
 Mikey Montgomery – drums
 Mike "Rickshaw" Martin – bass
 Courtney LaPlante – lead vocals
Guest appearances
Steve Vai - guitar on "Carnage Asada"
Production
Steven Bradley  - production
Artwork
Aaron Marsh

References

2013 albums
Iwrestledabearonce albums
Century Media Records albums